Sagephora is a genus of moths belonging to the family Tineidae.

Species
Sagephora exsanguis Philpott, 1918
Sagephora felix Meyrick, 1914
Sagephora jocularis Philpott, 1926
Sagephora phortegella Meyrick, 1888
Sagephora steropastis Meyrick, 1891
Sagephora subcarinata Meyrick, 1931

References

Tineidae
Taxa named by Edward Meyrick
Tineidae genera